Philip Jeremiah Schuyler (January 21, 1768 – February 21, 1835) was an American politician from New York. His siblings included Angelica Schuyler, Elizabeth Schuyler Hamilton, and Margarita Schuyler Van Rensselaer.

Life
He was the son of Revolutionary War General Philip Schuyler (1733–1804) and Catherine Van Rensselaer (1734–1803). The Schuyler family were intermarried with other prominent New York families, including the Van Cortlandts and Livingstons, and his relatives included uncle Jeremiah Van Rensselaer.  Alexander Hamilton, John Barker Church, and Stephen Van Rensselaer were all his brothers-in-law.  He received his education through private tutors.

Career
Schuyler came to Rhinebeck in 1796 and in 1800 erected a mansion he called "The Grove".
From there he managed farms and estates throughout upstate New York which were owned by his and his wife's families.   Schuyler served in the New York Militia and attained the rank of major before resigning in 1799. He returned to service with the War of 1812, during which he held the rank of colonel.

He was a member of the New York State Assembly, serving in the 21st New York State Legislature, representing Dutchess County, and in the 22nd New York State Legislature, representing Albany County. He was elected as a Federalist to the 15th United States Congress, holding office from March 4, 1817, to March 3, 1819.

Personal life

Schuyler married Sarah Rutsen (1770–1803), daughter of John Rutsen (1743–1771) and a descendant of Wilhelmus Beekman, and inheritor of a large portion of the Beekman Patent, which encompassed much of what is now Dutchess County. Together, they had:

 Philip P. Schuyler (1789–1875), who married Rosanna Livingston
 Stephen Van Rensselaer Schuyler (1792–1859), who married Catherine Morris
 Catherine Schuyler (1793–1875), who married Samuel Jones (1770–1853)
 John Rutsen Schuyler (1796–1875)
 Robert Schuyler (1798–1855), who married Lucinda Wood (1807–1882), an 1817 graduate of Harvard and railroad speculator/embezzler.

After his first wife died, he married Mary Anna Sawyer (1786–1852) of Newburyport, Massachusetts. She was a daughter of Micajah Sawyer (1737–1817), a founding member of American Academy of Arts and Sciences and Sibyl Farnham (1747–1842). Together, they had:

 William Schuyler (1807–1829)
 Sybil Schuyler (1809–1813)
 George Lee Schuyler (1811–1890), who married Eliza Hamilton (1811–1863), daughter of James Hamilton.  After her death, he married Eliza's sister, Mary Morris Hamilton (1815–1877)

He died of tuberculosis, and was buried at New York Marble Cemetery.  His remains were later moved to the Poughkeepsie Rural Cemetery.

His home, an estate he called The Grove, was added to the National Register of Historic Places in 1987.

Descendants
Through his youngest son George, he was the grandfather of General Philip Schuyler (1836–1906). Schuyler was a prominent society figure who was featured in Ward McAllister's famous The Four Hundred.

References
Notes

Sources
Political Graveyard

External links

1768 births
1835 deaths
18th-century American politicians
19th-century American politicians
19th-century deaths from tuberculosis
American military personnel of the War of 1812
American militia officers
American people of Dutch descent
American slave owners
Burials at New York Marble Cemetery
Burials at Poughkeepsie Rural Cemetery
Federalist Party members of the United States House of Representatives from New York (state)
Members of the New York State Assembly
Military personnel from Albany, New York
People from New York (state) in the War of 1812
People from Rhinebeck, New York
Politicians from Albany, New York
Philip Jeremiah
Tuberculosis deaths in New York (state)
Philip Jeremiah